The Sri Lanka Army Pioneer Corps (SLAPC) is a (reserve) regiment of the Sri Lanka Army. Established as manpower reserve to be utilized in times of strikes and union action to maintain the functionality of essential services and other state functions, other such units that existed then and has since been disband include the Post and Telegraph Signals (PTS) and the Ceylon Railway Engineer Corps (CREC). With the escalation of the Sri Lankan Civil War the regiment has taken up combat duties.

History
The Ceylon Army Pioneer Corps was raised on 5 July 1959 with a large strength of 14,000 men. The unit is part of the Volunteer Force and was based on the Ceylon Pioneers. Lt Col M.W.F. Abayakoon of the Cadet Corps was appointed its commanding officer. The main reason to raise this unit with a large strength was the frequent breakdown of essential services at that time due to workers unrest and strikes. Members of the corps used to handle harbour duties and driving of public transport. The Pioneer Corps brought back normalcy in the harbour and other establishments, and the country was saved from starvation as foreign ships were threatening to bypass the Colombo harbor due to delays in unloading as a result of constant trade union action. When the workers’ unrest in the city was settled, in 1962 the Pioneers were employed in the Kantale Sugar Corporation to perform duties when the workers their went on strike.

In 1964 the pioneers assisted the field engineers of the Sri Lanka Engineers in constructing the Dambulla – Galewela Road and Katunayake Airport Road.

Since the 1971 Insurrection, the Pioneers have also been employed in internal security duties all over the island. Pioneer Corps was employed in building the New Defence Headquarters Complex.

Units

Volunteers
1st Bn Sri Lanka Army Pioneer Corps (Formed on 5 July 1959)
2nd Bn Sri Lanka Army Pioneer Corps (Formed on 28 March 2016)

Order of precedence

See also
 Sri Lanka Army

References

External links and sources
 Sri Lanka Army
 Sri Lanka Army Pioneer Corps

P
P
Military units and formations established in 1959